Álvaro Ginés Hernández-Sánchez (born 15 March 2005) is a Spanish professional footballer who plays as a forward for Real Madrid U19s.

Club career
Ginés was a youth product of Ciudad Jardín EF and Cartagena before joining Real Madrid's youth setup in 2020. A prolific goalscorer, he has scored over 100 goals youth sides since joining Real Madrid. In September 2022, he was named by English newspaper The Guardian as one of the best players born in 2005 worldwide.

International career
Ginés is a youth international for Spain, having represented the country at the U17 and U18 levels.

Playing style
Ginés is a clever, small goalscorer that works hard and can play physically. He can also link up well, has great movement and can operate with back to goal, earning playstyle comparisons with Karim Benzema.

References

External links
 Real Madrid profile
 
 

2005 births
Living people
Sportspeople from Cartagena, Spain
Spanish footballers
Spain international footballers
Association football forwards
Real Madrid CF players